Admir Velagić (born 19 October 1975) is a Bosnian-Herzegovinian retired professional footballer. He also was a sports director at hometown club Velež Mostar.

International career
He made his debut for Bosnia and Herzegovina in an August 1999 friendly match away against Liechtenstein and has earned a total of 4 (1 unofficial) caps, scoring no goals. His final international was a February 2003 friendly against Wales.

References

External links
 
 

1975 births
Living people
Sportspeople from Mostar
Association football midfielders
Bosnia and Herzegovina footballers
Bosnia and Herzegovina international footballers
FK Velež Mostar players
CP Mérida footballers
NK GOŠK Gabela players
NK Troglav 1918 Livno players
Premier League of Bosnia and Herzegovina players
Segunda División players
First League of the Federation of Bosnia and Herzegovina players
Bosnia and Herzegovina expatriate footballers
Expatriate footballers in Spain
Bosnia and Herzegovina expatriate sportspeople in Spain